The electoral threshold, or election threshold, is the minimum share of the primary vote that a candidate or political party requires to achieve before they become entitled to representation or additional seats in a legislature. This limit can operate in various ways, e.g. in party-list proportional representation systems where an electoral threshold requires that a party must receive a specified minimum percentage of votes (e.g. 5%), either nationally or in a particular electoral district, to obtain seats in the legislature. In Single transferable voting the election threshold is called the quota and it is possible to pass it by use of first choice votes alone or by a combination of first choice votes and votes transferred from other candidates based on lower preferences (and it is possible to be elected under STV even if a candidate does not pass the election threshold). In MMP systems the election threshold determines which parties are eligible for top-up seats (but some MMP system allow parties to get top-up even without receiving the threshold of votes by winning one or more district seats).

The effect of an electoral threshold is to deny representation to small parties or to force them into coalitions, with the presumption of rendering the election system more stable by keeping out fringe parties. Proponents say that simply having a few seats in a legislature can significantly boost the profile of a fringe party and that providing representation and possibly veto power for a party that receives only 1% of the vote not be appropriate; however, critics posit that in the absence of a ranked ballot system (STV, spare vote or other), supporters of minor parties are effectively disenfranchised when barred from the top-up seats and are denied the right to be represented by someone of their choosing.

Two boundaries can be defined—a threshold of representation is the minimum vote share that might yield a party a seat under the most favorable circumstances for the party, while the threshold of exclusion is the maximum vote share that could be insufficient to yield a seat under the least favorable circumstances. Arend Lijphart suggested calculating the informal threshold as the mean of these.

Some MMP systems allow a party that wins a local seat to be eligible for top-up seats even if it does not exceed the election threshold.

Recommendations for electoral thresholds 
The Parliamentary Assembly of the Council of Europe recommends for parliamentary elections a threshold not higher than 3%. For single transferable vote, to put the natural threshold at about 10 percent, John M. Carey and Simon Hix recommend a low district magnitude of 6 or so. But most STV systems used today sets the amount of votes for election of most members at Droop quota, which in a six-member district is 14 percent.

Electoral thresholds in various countries

In Poland's Sejm, Lithuania's Seimas, Germany's Bundestag and New Zealand's House of Representatives, the threshold is 5% (in Poland, additionally 8% for a coalition of two or more parties submitting a joint electoral list and in Lithuania, additionally 7% for coalition). However, in New Zealand, if a party wins a directly elected seats, the threshold does not apply.

The threshold is 3.25% in Israel's Knesset (it was 1% before 1992, 1.5% in 1992–2003 and 2% 2003–2014) and 7% in the Turkish parliament. In Poland, ethnic minority parties do not have to reach the threshold level to get into the parliament and so there is always a small German minority representation (at minimum, one member) in the Sejm. In Romania, for the ethnic minority parties there is a different threshold than for the national parties that run for the Chamber of Deputies.

There are also countries such as Portugal, South Africa, Finland, the Netherlands and North Macedonia that have proportional representation systems without a legal threshold, although the Netherlands has a rule that the first seat can never be a remainder seat, which means that there is an effective threshold of 100% divided by the total number of seats (with 150 seats to allocate, this threshold is currently 0.67%).

Australia
For the Senate of Australia, which is elected through the single transferable vote (STV) form of proportional representation, the need for a formal electoral threshold is rendered moot due to the presence of small electorates that return comparatively few members to Parliament (and as such, they require a relatively high percentage of the vote (as determined through the Droop quota) in order to be elected). As STV is a ranked voting system, supporters of minor parties are not disenfranchised as their votes are redistributed to other candidates according to the individual's indicated 2nd and further preferences.

Germany
Germany, has a regular threshold of 5%, and ethnic minority parties have no threshold. The 2021 election demonstrated the exception for ethnic minority party: the South Schleswig Voters' Association entered the Bundestag with just 0.1% as a registered party for Danish and Frisian minorities. The exception to the 5% electoral threshold by winning three constituency seats has been repealed in 2023. That exception allowed the The Left to qualify for list votes despite getting just 4.9%.

Norway
In Norway, the nationwide electoral threshold of 4% applies only to leveling seats. A party with sufficient local support may still win the regular district seats, even if the party fails to meet the threshold. For example, the 2021 election saw the Green Party and Christian Democratic Party each win three district seats, and Patient Focus winning one district seat despite missing the threshold.

Slovenia
In Slovenia, the threshold was set at 3 parliamentary seats during parliamentary elections in 1992 and 1996. This meant that the parties needed to win about 3.2% of the votes in order to pass the threshold. In 2000, the threshold was raised to 4% of the votes.

Sweden
In Sweden, there is a nationwide threshold of 4% for the Riksdag, but if a party reaches 12% in any electoral constituency, it will take part in the seat allocation for that constituency. As of the 2022 election, nobody has been elected based on the 12% rule.

United States

In the United States, as the majority of elections are conducted under the first-past-the-post system, legal electoral thresholds do not apply in the actual voting. However, several states have threshold requirements for parties to obtain automatic ballot access to the next general election without having to submit voter-signed petitions. The threshold requirements have no practical bearing on the two main political parties (the Republican and Democratic parties) as they easily meet the requirements, but have come into play for minor parties such as the Green and Libertarian parties. The threshold rules also apply for independent candidates to obtain ballot access.

List of electoral thresholds by country

Europe

The electoral threshold for elections to the European Parliament varies for each member state, a threshold of up to 5% is applied for individual electoral districts, no threshold is applied across the whole legislative body.

Non-European countries

Legal challenges 
The German Federal Constitutional Court rejected an electoral threshold for the European Parliament in 2011 and in 2014 based on the principle of one person, one vote.
In the case of Turkey, in 2004 the Parliamentary Assembly of the Council of Europe declared this threshold to be manifestly excessive and asked Turkey to lower it (Council of Europe Resolution 1380 (2004)). On 30 January 2007 the European Court of Human Rights ruled by five votes to two and on 8 July 2008, its Grand Chamber by 13 votes to four that the former 10% threshold imposed in Turkey does not violate the right to free elections (Article 3 of Protocol 1 of the ECHR). It held, however, that this same threshold could violate the Convention if imposed in a different country. It was justified in the case of Turkey in order to stabilize the volatile political situation over recent decades.

Natural threshold
The number of seats in each electoral district creates a "hidden" natural threshold (also called an effective, or informal threshold). The number of votes that means that a party is guaranteed a seat can be calculated by the formula where ε is the smallest possible number of votes. That means that in a district with four seats slightly more than 20% of the votes will guarantee a seat. Under more favorable circumstances, the party can still win a seat with fewer votes. The most important factor in determining the natural threshold is the number of seats to be filled by the district. Other less important factors are the seat allocation formula (D'Hondt, Saint-Laguë, LR-Droop or Hare), the number of contestant political parties and the size of the assembly. Generally, smaller districts leads to a higher proportion of votes needed to win a seat and vice versa. The lower bound (the threshold of representation or the percentage of the vote that allows a party to earn a seat under the most favorable circumstances) is more difficult to calculate. In addition to the factors mentioned earlier, the number of votes cast for smaller parties are important. If more votes are cast for parties that do not win any seat, that will mean a lower percentage of votes needed to win a seat.

Notable cases
An extreme example occurred in Turkey following the 2002 Turkish general election, where almost none of the 550 incumbent MPs were returned. This was a seismic shift that rocked Turkish politics to its foundations. None of the political parties that had passed the threshold in 1999, passed it again: DYP got only 9.55% of the popular vote, MHP got 8.34%, GP 7.25%, DEHAP 6.23%, ANAP 5.13%, SP 2.48% and DSP 1.22%. The aggregate number of wasted votes was an unprecented 46.33% (14,545,438). As a result, Erdoğan's AKP gained power, winning more than two-thirds of the seats in the Parliament with just 34.28% of the vote, with only one opposition party (CHP, which by itself failed to pass threshold in 1999) and 9 independents.

Other dramatic events can be produced by the loophole often added in mixed-member proportional representation (used throughout Germany since 1949, New Zealand since 1993): there the threshold rule for party lists includes an exception for parties that won 3 (Germany) or 1 (New Zealand) single-member districts. The party list vote helps calculate the desirable number of MPs for each party. Major parties can help minor ally parties overcome the hurdle, by letting them win one or a few districts:
 2008 New Zealand general election: While New Zealand First got only 4.07% of the list vote (so it was not returned to parliament), ACT New Zealand won 3.65% of the list vote, but its leader won an electorate seat (Epsom), which entitled the party to list seats (4). In the 2011 election, leaders of the National Party and ACT had tea together before the press to promote the implicit alliance (see tea tape scandal). After their victories, the Nationals passed a confidence and supply agreement with ACT to form the Fifth National Government of New Zealand.
 In Germany, the post-communist PDS and its successor Die Linke often hovered around the 5% threshold: In 1994, it won only 4.4% of the party list vote, but won four districts in East Berlin, which saved it, earning 30 MPs in total. In 2002, it achieved only 4.0% of the party list vote, and won just two districts, this time excluding the party from proportional representation. This resulted in a narrow red-green majority and a second term for Gerhard Schröder, which would not have been possible had the PDS won a third constituency. In 2021, it won only 4.9% of the party list vote, but won the bare minimum of three districts (Berlin-Lichtenberg, Berlin-Treptow-Köpenick, and Leipzig II), salvaging the party, which received 39 MPs.

The failure of one party to reach the threshold not only deprives their candidates of office and their voters of representation; it also changes the power index in the assembly, which may have dramatic implications for coalition-building.
 Slovakia, 2002. The True Slovak National Party (PSNS) split from Slovak National Party (SNS), and Movement for Democracy (HZD) split from the previously dominant People's Party – Movement for a Democratic Slovakia. All of them failed to cross the 5% threshold with PSNS having 3.65%, SNS 3.33% and HZD 3.26% respectively, thus allowing a center-right coalition despite having less than 43% of the vote.
 Norway, 2009. The Liberal Party got 3.9% of the votes, below the 4% threshold for leveling seats, although still winning two seats. Hence, while right-wing opposition parties won more votes between them than the parties in the governing coalition, the narrow failure of the Liberal Party to cross the threshold kept the governing coalition in power. It crossed the threshold again at the following election with 5.2%.
 In the 2013 German federal election, the FDP, in Parliament since 1949, got only 4.8% of the list vote, and won no single district, excluding the party altogether. This, along with the failure of the right-wing eurosceptic party AfD (4.7%), gave a left-wing majority in Parliament despite a center-right majority of votes (CDU/CSU itself fell short of an absolute majority by just 5 seats). As a result, Merkel's CDU/CSU formed a grand coalition with the SPD. 
 Poland, 2015. The United Left achieved 7.55%, which is below the 8% threshold for multi-party coalitions. Furthermore, KORWiN only reached 4.76%, narrowly missing the 5% threshold for individual parties. This allowed the victorious PiS to obtain a majority of seats with 37% of the vote. This was the first parliament without left-wing parties represented.
 Israel, April 2019. Among the 3 lists representing right-wing to far-right Zionism and supportive of Netanyahu, only one crossed the threshold the right-wing government had increased to 3.25%: the Union of the Right-Wing Parties with 3.70%, while future Prime Minister Bennett's New Right narrowly failed at 3.22%, and Zehut only 2.74%, destroying Netanyahu's chances of another majority, and leading to snap elections in September.
 Czech Republic, 2021. Přísaha (4.68%), ČSSD (4.65%) and KSČM (3.60%) all failed to cross the 5% threshold, thus allowing a coalition of Spolu and PaS. This was also the first time that neither ČSSD nor KSČM had representation in parliament since 1992.

Memorable dramatic losses:
 In the 1990 German federal election, the Western Greens did not meet the threshold, which was applied separately for former East and West Germany. The Greens could not take advantage of this, because the "Alliance 90" (which had absorbed the East German Greens) ran separately from "The Greens" in the West. Together, they would have narrowly passed the 5.0% threshold (West: 4.8%, East: 6.2%). The Western Greens returned to the Bundestag in 1994.
 Israel, 1992. The extreme right-wing Tehiya (Revival) got 1.2% of the votes, which was below the threshold which it had itself voted to raise to 1.5%. It thus lost its three seats.
 In Bulgaria, the so-called "blue parties" or "urban right" which include SDS, DSB, Yes, Bulgaria!, DBG, ENP and Blue Unity frequently get just above or below the electoral threshold depending on formation of electoral alliances: In the EP election 2007, DSB 4.74% and SDS 4.35% were campaigning separately and both fell below the natural electoral of around 5%. In 2009 Bulgarian parliamentary election, DSB and SDS ran together as Blue Coalition gaining 6.76%. In 2013 Bulgarian parliamentary election, campaigning separately DGB got 3.25%, DSB 2.93%, SDS 1.37% and ENP 0.17%, thus all of them failed to cross the threshold this even led to a tie between the former opposition and the parties right of the centre. In the EP election 2014, SDS, DSB and DBG ran as Reformist Bloc gaining 6.45% and crossing the electoral threshold, while Blue Unity campaigned separately and did not cross the electoral threshold. In 2017 Bulgarian parliamentary election, SDS and DBG ran as Reformist Bloc gaining 3.06%, "Yes, Bulgaria!" got 2.88%, DSB 2.48%, thus all of them failed to cross the electoral threshold. In the EP election 2019, "Yes, Bulgaria!" and DBG ran together as Democratic Bulgaria and crossed the electoral threshold with 5.88%. In November 2021, electoral alliance Democratic Bulgaria crossed electoral threshold with 6.28%.
 Slovakia, 2010. Both the Party of the Hungarian Community which (including their predecessors) hold seats in parliament since the Velvet Revolution and the People's Party – Movement for a Democratic Slovakia, which dominated in the 1990s, got an 4.33% thus failed the 5% threshold.
 Slovakia, 2016. The Christian Democratic Movement achieved 4.94% missing only 0.06% votes to reach the threshold which meant the first absence of the party since the Velvet Revolution and the first democratic elections in 1990.
 Slovakia, 2020. The coalition between Progressive Slovakia and SPOLU won 6.96% of votes, falling only 0.04% short of the 7% threshold for coalitions. This was an unexpected defeat since the coalition had won seats in the 2019 European election and won the 2019 presidential election less than a year earlier. In addition, two other parties won fewer votes but were able to win seats due to the lower threshold for single parties (5%). This was also the first election since the Velvet Revolution in which no party of the Hungarian minority crossed the 5% threshold.
 Lithuania, 2020. The LLRA–KŠS won only 4.80% of the party list votes.
 Madrid, Spain, 2021. Despite achieving 26 seats with 19.37% of the votes in the previous election, the liberal Ciudadanos party crashed down to just 3.54% in the 2021 snap election called by Isabel Díaz Ayuso, failing to get close to the 5% threshold.
 Slovenia, 2022. Democratic Party of Pensioners of Slovenia only achieved 0.62% of the vote. This was the first time when DeSUS did not reached the 4% since 1996 which was part of almost every coalition since its foundation.
 Germany, 2022 Saarland state election. Alliance 90/The Greens fell 23 votes or 0.005% short of reaching representation. The Left fell from 12.8% to below the electoral threshold with 2.6% in their only western stronghold. Total percentage of votes not represented was 22.3%.
 Israel, 2022 Israeli legislative election. Meretz fell to 3.16% thus failed to cross the threshold for the first time.

There has been cases of tries to attempts to circumvent thresholds:
 Slovakia, 1998. Slovak Democratic Coalition ran as political party because the threshold was 25%.
 Turkey, 2007 and 2011. The DTP/BDP-led Thousand Hope Candidates and Labour, Democracy and Freedom Bloc only gained 3.81% (2007) and 5.67% (2011) of the vote not crossing the 10% threshold but because they ran as independents they won 22 and 36 seats.
 Poland, 2019. After the United Left and KORWiN failed to cross the thresholds in 2015 both of them with their new alliances bypassed the coalition threshold by either running under SLD label (Lewica) or registering their alliance as a party itself (Confederation). Similarly to Lewica, the Polish Coalition ran under Polish People's Party label. Lewica and Polish Coalition would have crossed the coalition threshold of 8% with 12.56% and 8.55% respectively while Confederation only gained 6.81% of the vote.
 Czechia, 2021. The Tricolour–Svobodní–Soukromníci alliance tried to bypass the coalition threshold by renaming Tricolour to include the names of their partners but they only 2.76% failing to cross the usual 5% threshold.

Amount of unrepresented vote

Electoral thresholds can sometimes seriously affect the relationship between the percentages of the popular vote achieved by each party and the distribution of seats. The proportionality between seat share and popular vote can be measured by the Gallagher index. While the amount of unrepresented vote is a measure of the total amount of voters not represented by any party sitting in the legislature and is related to No taxation without representation.

The failure of one party to reach the threshold not only deprives their candidates of office and their voters of representation; it also changes the power index in the assembly, which may have dramatic implications for coalition-building.

The amount of unrepresented vote changes from one election to another, here shown for New Zealand. The unrepresented vote changes depending on voter behavior and size of effective electoral threshold, for example in 2005 New Zealand general election every party above 1% got seats due to the electoral threshold in New Zealand of at least one seat in first-past-the-post voting, which caused a much lower unrepresented vote compared to the other years.

In the Russian parliamentary elections in 1995, with a threshold excluding parties under 5%, more than 45% of votes went to parties that failed to reach the threshold. In 1998, the Russian Constitutional Court found the threshold legal, taking into account limits in its use.

After the first implementation of the threshold in Poland in 1993 34.4% of the popular vote did not gain representation.

There had been a similar situation in Turkey, which had a 10% threshold, easily higher than in any other country. The justification for such a high threshold was to prevent multi-party coalitions and put a stop to the endless fragmentation of political parties seen in the 1960s and 1970s. However, coalitions ruled between 1991 and 2002, but mainstream parties continued to be fragmented and in the 2002 elections as many as 45% of votes were cast for parties which failed to reach the threshold and were thus unrepresented in the parliament. All parties which won seats in 1999 failed to cross the threshold, thus giving Justice and Development Party 66% of the seats.

In the Ukrainian elections of March 2006, for which there was a threshold of 3% (of the overall vote, i.e. including invalid votes), 22% of voters were effectively disenfranchised, having voted for minor candidates. In the parliamentary election held under the same system, fewer voters supported minor parties and the total percentage of disenfranchised voters fell to about 12%.

In Bulgaria, 24% of voters cast their ballots for parties that would not gain representation in the elections of 1991 and 2013.

In the 2020 Slovak parliamentary election, 28.47% of all valid votes did not gain representation. In the 2021 Czech legislative election 19.76 percent of voters were not represented. In the 2022 Slovenian parliamentary election 24% of the vote went to parties which did not reach the 4% threshold including several former parliamentary parties (LMŠ, PoS, SAB, SNS and DeSUS).

In the Philippines where party-list seats are only contested in 20% of the 287 seats in the lower house, the effect of the 2% threshold is increased by the large number of parties participating in the election, which means that the threshold is harder to reach. This led to a quarter of valid votes being wasted, on average and led to the 20% of the seats never being allocated due to the 3-seat cap In 2007, the 2% threshold was altered to allow parties with less than 1% of first preferences to receive a seat each and the proportion of wasted votes reduced slightly to 21%, but it again increased to 29% in 2010 due to an increase in number of participating parties. These statistics take no account of the wasted votes for a party which is entitled to more than three seats but cannot claim those seats due to the three-seat cap.

Electoral thresholds can produce a spoiler effect, similar to that in the first-past-the-post voting system, in which minor parties unable to reach the threshold take votes away from other parties with similar ideologies. Fledgling parties in these systems often find themselves in a vicious circle: if a party is perceived as having no chance of meeting the threshold, it often cannot gain popular support; and if the party cannot gain popular support, it will continue to have little or no chance of meeting the threshold. As well as acting against extremist parties, it may also adversely affect moderate parties if the political climate becomes polarized between two major parties at opposite ends of the political spectrum. In such a scenario, moderate voters may abandon their preferred party in favour of a more popular party in the hope of keeping the even less desirable alternative out of power.

On occasion, electoral thresholds have resulted in a party winning an outright majority of seats without winning an outright majority of votes, the sort of outcome that a proportional voting system is supposed to prevent. For instance, the Turkish AKP won a majority of seats with less than 50% of votes in three consecutive elections (2002, 2007 and 2011). In the 2013 Bavarian state election, the Christian Social Union failed to obtain a majority of votes, but nevertheless won an outright majority of seats due to a record number of votes for parties which failed to reach the threshold, including the Free Democratic Party (the CSU's coalition partner in the previous state parliament). In Germany in 2013 15.7% voted for a party that did not meet the 5% threshold.

In contrast, elections that use the ranked voting system can take account of each voter's complete indicated ranking preference. For example, the single transferable vote redistributes first preference votes for candidates below the threshold. This permits the continued participation in the election by those whose votes would otherwise be wasted. Minor parties can indicate to their supporters before the vote how they would wish to see their votes transferred. The single transferable vote  is a proportional voting system designed to achieve proportional representation through ranked voting in multi-seat (as opposed to single seat) organizations or constituencies (voting districts). Ranked voting systems are widely used in Australia and Ireland. Other methods of introducing ordinality into an electoral system can have similar effects.

See also
 List of democracy and elections-related topics

Notes

External links
 PACE report on electoral thresholds, 2010

Electoral systems
Electoral restrictions